Banahan is a surname. Notable people with the surname include:

Matt Banahan (born 1986), rugby union player
Mary Gertrude Banahan ( 1856–1932), New Zealand catholic nun